Castilleja elmeri is a species of flowering plant in the family Orobanchaceae with the common name Elmer's paintbrush. As with most Castilleja species, this is a facultative root hemiparasite and will usually be seen growing close to a host plant.

Description
Leaves are lanceolate and the flowers form a relatively (for a Castilleja) compact head that is usually red or pale yellow, sometimes nearly white.

Range and habitat
Castilleja elmeri grows in mountains from southern British Columbia to the Wenatchee Mountains in Washington State. In the Wenatchee Mountains it is notable for being common on serpentine soils.

References

elmeri
Flora of British Columbia
Flora of Washington (state)
Taxa named by Merritt Lyndon Fernald